Chris Dugan (born May 11, 1973) is an American Grammy-winning audio engineer, cinematographer, record producer, musician, and singer, best known as the drummer of the Effection and as an audio engineer for Green Day. In 2018, along with Green Day members Billie Joe Armstrong and Mike Dirnt, guitarist Jason White, and tour manager Bill Schneider, he formed The Coverups, for which he plays drums.

History
Dugan began his musical pursuits as a drummer. Needing to be resourceful, he learned to do basic recordings for his high school bands. Engineering was an instinctual progression and it was the purist recording styles of the '60s and '70s that really inspired him. In 1996, he opened Nu-Tone Studios in Pittsburg, California with fellow engineer Willie Samuels, renting space from local Studio 880 in Oakland. Nu-Tone quickly became an indie band favorite, drawing the local rock scene and labels like Lookout!, Adeline, and Alternative Tentacles. In 2002, Dugan began engineering for Green Day at Jingletown Recording. In 2003, The Effection, with Dugan as the band's drummer, released the album Soundtrack to a Moment via Adeline Records. In 2009, he won his first Grammy with Green Day's 21st Century Breakdown for Best Rock Album.

Dugan currently resides in Oakland, California. In August 2013, he married Mari Tanaka, Jingletown Recording's studio manager.

Projects
Dugan has worked with bands such as U2, Iggy Pop, Green Day, and Smash Mouth. He has also worked with producers Rob Cavallo, Butch Vig, Bob Ezrin, and Jeff Saltzman. In 2009, he won the Grammy for Best Rock Album of the Year for engineering Green Day’s “21st Century Breakdown.” In 2010, he won the Grammy for Best Musical Show Album for engineering Green Day’s "American Idiot: The Original Broadway Cast Recording”.

Partial discography

Other work
2009 – Video: – Green Day – "East Jesus Nowhere" – Director, Camera, Photography
2012 – Video: – Green Day – Awesome As Fuck – Director

References 

1. 
2. https://web.archive.org/web/20091008002123/http://www.grammy.com/GRAMMY_Awards/Winners/Results.aspx?title=&winner=Green%20Day&year=0&genreID=0&hp=1
3. https://web.archive.org/web/20110921052233/http://www.eqmag.com/article/green-day-simple/jul-09/97443
4. https://web.archive.org/web/20110629142021/http://mixonline.com/recording/tracking/audio_green_day_3/index.html

American audio engineers
Grammy Award winners
American cinematographers
American drummers
American photographers
Living people
Place of birth missing (living people)
1973 births
21st-century American drummers